Ring of Honor has held a variety of professional wrestling tournaments competed for by wrestlers that are a part of their personnel.

ROH Championship Tournament (2002)

On June 22, 2002, Ring of Honor held an ROH Championship tournament to crown the inaugural ROH Champion. The Finals of the tournament was a four way iron man match that took place July 27, 2002.

ROH Tag Team Championship Tournament (2002)

On September 21, 2002, Ring of Honor held an ROH Tag Team Championship tournament to crown the inaugural ROH Tag Team Champions.

Field of Honor (2003)
The Field of Honor was a professional wrestling tournament held from September 6, 2003 until December 27, 2003 by the Ring of Honor promotion. It was held as a round-robin, with winners from two blocks wrestling in the final to decide that winner. The winner of each block is determined by a points system; one point for a victory, one point for a draw, and zero points for a loss.

ROH Pure Wrestling Championship Tournament (2004)

On February 14, 2004, Ring of Honor held a tournament for the ROH Pure Wrestling Championship to crown the inaugural champion at Second Anniversary Show.

ROH Pure Championship Tournament (2004)
On July 17, 2004, Ring of Honor held a tournament for the vacant ROH Pure Championship.

Best of the American Super Juniors Tournament (2005)
On April 2, 2005, Ring of Honor held a tournament to crown the best American Super Junior in ROH.

Race To The Top Tournament (2007)
On July 27, 2007, Ring of Honor held a tournament to determine a number one contender for the ROH World Championship. The Finals of the tournament took place July 28, 2007.

ROH World Championship #1 Contender Tournament (February 2008)
On February 22, 2008, Ring of Honor held a tournament to crown a number one contender for the ROH World Championship.

ROH World Championship #1 Contender Tournament (March 2008)
On March 14, 2008, Ring of Honor held a tournament to crown a number one contender for the ROH World Championship. The Finals of the tournament took place March 16, 2008 it was a four corner survival match.

ROH World Tag Team Championship Tournament (2008)
On June 6, 2008, Ring of Honor held an ROH World Tag Team Championship tournament for the vacant ROH World Tag Team Championships.

Teams:
The Age of the Fall (Tyler Black and Jimmy Jacobs)
Delirious and Pelle Primeau
Sweet 'n' Sour Inc. (Adam Pearce and Chris Hero)
The Vulture Squad (Jigsaw and Ruckus)
El Generico and Kevin Steen
Go Shiozaki and Nigel McGuinness
Austin Aries and Bryan Danielson
No Remorse Corps (Davey Richards and Roderick Strong)

ROH World Television Championship Tournament (2010)

On February 5, 2010, Ring of Honor held a tournament to crown the inaugural ROH World Television Championship. The Finals of the tournament took place on March 5, 2010

ROH World Tag Team Championship #1 Contender Lottery Tournament (2011)
On July 8, 2011, Ring of Honor held a number one contenders tournament for the ROH World Tag Team Championship.

Teams:
The Bravado Brothers (Harlem and Lance Bravado)
The Briscoe Brothers (Jay and Mark Briscoe)
Adam Cole and Kyle O'Reilly
Caprice Coleman and Cedric Alexander

Rise and Prove Tournament (2012)
On February 17, 2012, Ring of Honor held the Rise and Prove tournament for up and coming wrestlers.

Teams:
TMDK (Mikey Nicholls and Shane Haste)
Alabama Attitude (Corey Hollis and Mike Posey)
Rudy Switchblade and Shiloh Jonze
Chris Silvio and Sean Casey

March Mayhem Tournament (2012)
On March 3, 2012, Ring of Honor held a tournament the March Mayhem tournament.

ROH World Tag Team Championship Tournament (2012)
On August 3, 2012, Ring of Honor held a tournament for the vacant ROH World Tag Team Championship. The Finals of the tournament took place on September 15, 2012

Teams:
S.C.U.M. (Jimmy Jacobs and Steve Corino)
The Bravado Brothers (Harlem and Lance Bravado)
Caprice Coleman and Cedric Alexander
The Young Bucks (Matt and Nick Jackson)
Charlie Haas and Rhett Titus
The Guardians of Truth (Guardian #1 and Guardian #2)
The Briscoe Brothers (Jay and Mark Briscoe)
BLKOUT (Ruckus and Sabian)

ROH World Championship Tournament (2013)
On July 27, 2013, Ring of Honor held a tournament for the vacant ROH World Championship. The Finals of the tournament took place September 20, 2013.

ROH World Television Championship #1 Contender Tournament (2015)
On July 17, 2015, Ring of Honor held a tournament to crown a number one contender for the ROH World Television Championship.

ROH World Six-Man Tag Team Championship Tournament (2016)

On September 3, 2016, Ring of Honor held a tournament for the inaugural ROH World Six-Man Tag Team Championship. The Finals took place on December 2, 2016.

ROH Decade of Excellence Tournament (2016/17) 
The Decade of Excellence Tournament began on December 4, 2016 with the final taking place on January 14, 2017 to determine the new number one contender for the ROH World Championship.On March 10, 2017 at Ring of Honor's 15th Anniversary Show Christopher Daniels challenged and defeated Adam Cole to become ROH World Champion for the first time.

ROH Soaring Eagle Cup (2017)
The Soaring Eagle Cup took place on October 28, 2017.

Women of Honor Championship (2018)

Championship tournament to crown the first Women of Honor Champion.

Sea of Honor Tournament (2018)

ROH World Championship #1 Contender Tournament
In August 2019, ROH announced a tournament to crown to #1 contender for the ROH World Championship. The first round matches will be held at Death Before Dishonor XVII, the semifinals and finals will be held at Glory By Honor XVII. The winner will face the champion at Final Battle.

ROH Pure Championship Tournament (2020)

On January 30, 2020, nearly 14 years after it was retired, Ring of Honor announced they were reinstating the ROH Pure Championship, with a tournament to crown a new champion beginning in 2020. The tournament was supposed to begin on April 12 but ROH suspended its television production due to COVID-19 pandemic. ROH resumed television production in September and the tournament began on September 12.

ROH Women's World Championship Tournament (2021)

On January 1, 2020, ROH announced the deactivation of the Women of Honor World Championship in favor of the new ROH Women's World Championship. A "Quest for Gold" tournament was set for April 24 at the 2300 Arena in Philadelphia, Pennsylvania, but was canceled after ROH announced that it had postponed all live events due to the COVID-19 pandemic. At the ROH 19th Anniversary Show, ROH Board of Directors member Maria Kanellis-Bennett announce the tournament to take place in the summer of 2021.

References

 
Professional wrestling-related lists